Ann Helene Lippert (born July 14, 1963, Evanston, Illinois) is a comedian and actress. She  directed the audience interactive comedy Joni and Gina's Wedding, which she co-created and co-wrote with Marianne Basford and Hilarity Ensues Productions in 2002.

Her acting career began with classes at the Piven Theatre Workshop in Evanston, Illinois, where she studied for 8 years with her biggest influence, director/teacher Shira Piven.

Lippert is the daughter of an Irish Catholic mother and Chicago-born German father who is a semi-professional bowler. In her comedy, she parodies her family, her dad's bowling obsession, and relationships. As an actress she has had many parts in television and film.
In 2014 she will again be co-directing Joni and Gina's Wedding at the Viva Las Vegas Events Center in Las Vegas, NV.

External links

1963 births
Living people
American women comedians
American television actresses
American film actresses
Comedians from Illinois
People from Evanston, Illinois
21st-century American comedians
21st-century American actresses